The Hanbali school is one of the four major traditional Sunni schools (madhahib) of Islamic jurisprudence. It is named after the Arab scholar Ahmad ibn Hanbal (d. 855), and was institutionalized by his students. The Hanbali madhhab is the smallest of four major Sunni schools, the others being the Hanafi, Maliki and Shafi`i.

The Hanbali school derives sharia primarily from the Qur'an, the Hadiths (sayings and customs of Muhammad), and the views of Sahabah (Muhammad's companions). In cases where there is no clear answer in sacred texts of Islam, the Hanbali school does not accept istihsan (jurist discretion) or 'urf (customs of a community) as a sound basis to derive Islamic law, a method that Hanafi and Maliki Sunni madh'habs accept. Hanbali school is the strict traditionalist school of jurisprudence in Sunni Islam. It is found primarily in the countries of Saudi Arabia and Qatar, where it is the official Fiqh. Hanbali followers are the demographic majority in four emirates of UAE (Sharjah, Umm al-Quwain, Ras al-Khaimah and Ajman). Large minorities of Hanbali followers are also found in Bahrain, Syria, Oman and Yemen and among Iraqi and Jordanian bedouins.

The Hanbali school experienced a reformation during the 18th-century Wahhabi movement. Historically the school was small; during the 18th to early-20th century Muhammad ibn Abd al-Wahhab and Al Saud greatly aided its propagation around the world by way of their interpretation of the school's teachings. As a result of this, the school's name has become a controversial one in certain quarters of the Islamic world due to the influence he is believed by some to have had upon these teachings, which cites Ahmad Ibn Hanbal as a principal influence along with the thirteenth-century Hanbali reformer Ahmad Ibn Taymiyyah. However, it has been argued by certain scholars that Ibn Hanbal's own beliefs actually played "no real part in the establishment of the central doctrines of Wahhabism," as there is evidence, according to the same authors, that "the older Hanbalite authorities had doctrinal concerns very different from those of the Wahhabis," as medieval Hanbali literature is rich in references to saints, grave visitation, miracles, and relics. For example, contemporary Hanbali scholars, Muhammad Abdul-Wahid Al-Azhari and Yusuf Sadiq, openly criticize the followers of Ibn Abdul Wahhab and the former says they are not to be called Hanbalis. Historically, the Hanbali school was treated as simply another valid interpretation of Shariat (Islamic law), and many prominent medieval Sufis, such as Abdul Qadir Gilani, were Hanbali jurists and mystics at the same time.

History

Imam Ahmad ibn Hanbal, the founder of Hanbali school of thought (madhab), was a disciple of the Sunni Imam Al-Shafi‘i, who was reportedly a student of Imam Malik ibn Anas, who was a student of the Imam Ja'far al-Sadiq, like Imam Abu Hanifa. Thus all of the four great Imams of Sunni Fiqh are connected to Imam Ja'far al-Sadiq from the Bayt (Household) of Muhammad, whether directly or indirectly.

Like Al-Shafi'i and Dawud al-Zahiri, Ahmad was deeply concerned with the extreme elasticity being deployed by many jurists of his time, who used their discretion to reinterpret the doctrines of Qur'an and Hadiths to suit the demands of Caliphs and wealthy. Ibn Hanbal advocated for a literal interpretation of Qur'an and Hadiths. Influenced by the debates of his time, he was known for rejecting religious rulings (fatwas) from the 'Ijma (consensus) of jurists of his time, which he considered to be speculative theology (Kalam). He associated them with the Mu'tazilis, whom he despised. Ibn Hanbal was also hostile to the discretionary principles of rulings in jurisprudence (Usul al-fiqh) mainly championed by the people of opinion, which was established by Abu Hanifa, although he did adopt al-Shafi'i's method in usul al-fiqh. He linked these discretionary principles with kalam. His guiding principle was that the Quran and Sunnah are the only proper sources of Islamic jurisprudence, and are of equal authority and should be interpreted literally in line with the Athari creed. He also believed that there can be no true consensus (Ijma) among jurists (mujtahids) of his time, and preferred the consensus of Muhammad's companions (Sahaba) and weaker hadiths. Imam Hanbal himself compiled Al-Musnad, a text with over 30,000 saying, actions and customs of Muhammad.

Ibn Hanbal never composed an actual systematic legal theory on his own, and was against setting up juristic superstructures. He devoted himself to the task of collection and study of Hadith; and believed that legal rulings must be derived by referring directly to the Qur'an and Sunnah; instead of referring to a body of religious jurisprudence. However; his followers would later establish a systematic legal methodology some generations after Ibn Hanbal's death. Much of the work of preserving the school based on Ibn Hanbal's method was laid by his student Abu Bakr al-Khallal; his documentation on the founder's views eventually reached twenty volumes. The original copy of the work, which was contained in the House of Wisdom, was burned along with many other works of literature during the Mongol siege of Baghdad. The book was only preserved in a summarized form by the Hanbali jurist al-Khiraqi, who had access to written copies of al-Khallal's book before the siege.

Relations with the Abbasid Caliphate were rocky for the Hanbalites. Led by the Hanbalite scholar Al-Hasan ibn 'Ali al-Barbahari, the school often formed mobs of followers in 10th-century Baghdad who would engage in violence against fellow Sunnis suspected of committing sins and all Shi'ites. During al-Barbahari's leadership of the school in Baghdad, shops were looted, female entertainers were attacked in the streets, popular grievances among the lower classes were agitated as a source of mobilization, and public chaos in general ensued. Their efforts would be their own undoing in 935, when a series of  home invasions and mob violence on the part of al-Barbahari's followers in addition to perceived deviant views led to the Caliph Ar-Radi publicly condemning the school in its entirety and ending its official patronage by state religious bodies.

At some point between the 10th and 12th centuries, the Hanbali scholars began adopting the term “Salafi". The influential 13th century Hanbali theologian Ibn Taymiyya advocated Salafi thought as a theological endeavour and his efforts would create a lasting impact on the subsequent followers of the Hanbali school.

Principles

Sources of law
Like all other schools of Sunni Islam, the Hanbali school holds that the two primary sources of Islamic law are the Qur'an and the Sunnah found in Hadiths (compilation of sayings, actions and customs of Muhammad). Where these texts did not provide guidance, Imam Hanbal recommended guidance from established consensus of Muhammad's companions (Sahabah), then individual opinion of Muhammad's companions, followed in order of preference by weaker hadiths, and in rare cases qiyas (analogy). The Hanbali school, unlike Hanafi and Maliki schools, rejected that a source of Islamic law can be a jurist's personal discretionary opinion or consensus of later generation Muslims on matters that serve the interest of Islam and community. Hanbalis hold that this is impossible and leads to abuse. The Hanbali school also rejects taqlid (blind adherence to scholarly opinions) and encourages the practice of Ijtihad (independent reasoning) through the study of Quran and Hadith.

Ibn Hanbal rejected the possibility of religiously binding consensus (Ijma), as it was impossible to verify once later generations of Muslims spread throughout the world, going as far as declaring anyone who claimed as such to be a liar. Ibn Hanbal did, however, accept the possibility and validity of the consensus of the Sahaba the first generation of Muslims. Later followers of the school, however, expanded on the types of consensus accepted as valid, and the prominent Hanbalite Ibn Taymiyyah expanded legal consensus to later generations while at the same time restricting it only to the religiously learned. Analogical reasoning (Qiyas), was likewise rejected as a valid source of law by Ibn Hanbal himself, with a near-unanimous majority of later Hanbalite jurists not only accepting analogical reasoning as valid but also borrowing from the works of Shafi'ite jurists on the subject.

Ibn Hanbal's strict standards of acceptance regarding the sources of Islamic law were probably due to his suspicion regarding the field of Usul al-Fiqh, which he equated with speculative theology (kalam). While demanding strict application of Qur'an and Hadith, Hanbali Fiqh is nonetheless flexible in areas not covered by Scriptures. In issues where the Qur'an and the Hadiths were ambiguous or vague; the Hanbali Fuqaha (jurists) engaged in Ijtihad to derive rulings. Additionally, the Hanbali madh'hab accepted the Islamic principle of Maslaha ('public interest') in solving the novel issues. In the modern era, Hanbalites have branched out and even delved into matters regarding the upholding (Istislah) of public interest (Maslaha) and even juristic preference (Istihsan), anathema to the earlier Hanbalites as valid methods of determining religious law.

Theology
Ibn Hanbal taught that the Qur'an is uncreated due to Muslim belief that it is the word of God, and the word of God is not created. The Muʿtazilites taught that the Qur'an, which is readable and touchable, is created like other creatures and created objects. Ibn Hanbal viewed this as heresy, replying that there are things which are not touchable but are created, such as the Throne of God. Unlike the other three schools of Islamic jurisprudence (Hanafi, Maliki, and Shafi), the Hanbali madhab remained largely traditionalist or Athari in theology and it was primarily Hanbali scholars who codified the Athari school of thought.

Distinct rulings
 Wudu – One of the seven things which nullifies the minor purification includes, touching a person of the opposite sex for the purpose of carnal desire. This ruling is similar to the Maliki opinion, however the Shafi'i opinion is that merely touching will break the wudu, while the Hanafi opinion is that merely touching does not break the wudu.
 Al-Qayyam – One position of the school according to Kashshaf al-Qina` of al-Buhuti, and al-Mughni of Ibn Qudama is the same as that of Imam Abu Hanifa and his students; to place one’s hands below the navel. Another position is that hands are positioned above the navel or on the chest while standing in prayer, not similar to the Hanafis, though others state a person has a choice i.e. either above the navel or near the chest
 Ruku – The hands are to be raised (Rafa al-Yadayn) before going to ruku, and standing up from ruku, similar to the Shafi'i school. While standing up after ruku, a person has a choice to place their hands back to the position as they were before. Other madh'habs state the hands should be left on their sides.
 Tashahhud –  The finger should be pointed and not moved, upon mentioning the name of Allah.
 Taslim – Is considered obligatory by the Madh'hab.
 Salat-ul-Witr – Hanbalis  pray Two Rak'ats consecutively then perform Tasleem, and then One Rak'at is performed separately. Dua Qunoot is recited after the Ruku' during Witr, and Hands are raised during the Dua.
 In the absence of a valid excuse, it is obligatory (at least for adult men) to pray in congregation rather than individually.
 The majority of the Hanbali school considers admission in a court of law to be indivisible; that is, a plaintiff may not accept some parts of a defendant's testimony while rejecting other parts. This position is also held by the Zahiri school, though it is opposed by the Hanafi and Maliki schools.

Reception
The Hanbali school is now accepted as the fourth of the mainstream Sunni schools of law. It has traditionally enjoyed a smaller following than the other schools. In the earlier period, Sunni jurisprudence was based on four other schools: Hanafi, Maliki, Shafi'i and Zahiri; later on, the Hanbali school supplanted the Zahiri school's spot as the fourth mainstream school. Hanbalism essentially formed as a traditionalist reaction to what they viewed as bid'ah (innovations) on the part of the earlier established schools.

Historically, the school's legitimacy was not always accepted. Muslim exegete Muhammad ibn Jarir al-Tabari, founder of the now extinct Jariri school of law, was noted for ignoring the Hanbali school entirely when weighing the views of jurists; this was due to his view that the founder, Ibn Hanbal, was merely a scholar of  Hadith (prophetic traditions) and was not a Faqih (jurist) at all. The Hanbalites, led by Al-Barbahari, reacted by stoning Tabari's home several times, inciting riots so violent that Abbasid authorities had to subdue them by force. Upon Tabari's death, the Hanbalites formed a violent mob large enough that Abbasid officials buried him in secret, in an attempt to prevent further riots. Similarly, the Andalusian Malikite Jurist and theologian Ibn 'Abd al-Barr made a point to exclude Ibn Hanbal's views from the books on Sunni Muslim jurisprudence. 

Eventually, the Mamluk Sultanate and later the Ottoman Empire codified Sunni Islam as four schools, including the Hanbalite school at the expense of the Zahirites. The Hanafis, Shafi'is and Malikis agreed on important matters and recognized each other's systems as equally valid; this was not the case with the Hanbalites, who were recognized as legitimate by the older three schools but refused to return the favor.

Differences with other Sunni schools
In contrast to the Hanafis and the Malikis, in the absence of a 'Ijma (juristic consensus), the opinion of a Sahabi (companion of Prophet Muhammad) is given priority over Qiyas (analogical reasoning, which early Hanbalis rejected) or al-'urf (customs of a land) which is completely rejected by Hanbalis. While Hanbalis require a unanimous consensus, Hanafis tend to follow the consensus of Kufa and Malikis that of al-Madina.

Zahiris, a less mainstream school, is sometimes seen as the closest to Hanbalis and Hanafis. However the similarities are only true for early Zahiris who followed the Athari creed. The branch that was largely instigated by Ibn Hazm which developed in al-Andalus, al-Qarawiyyin and later became the official school of the state under the Almohads, differed significantly from Hanbalism. It did not follow the Athari and Taqlid schools and opted for "logical Istidlal" (deductive demonstration/inference) as a way to interpret scripture that wasn't clear literally. Hanbalis rejected kalam as a whole and believed in the supremacy of the text over the mind and did not engage in dialectic debates with the Mu'tazila. Ibn Hazm, on the other hand, engaged in these debates and believed in logical reasoning rejecting most of Mu'tazila claims as sophism and absurd. Ibn Hazm, also scrutinised hadith corpus more severely. He adopted an attitude where he'd reject hadiths if he discovered something suspicious about the lives of those who reported it, or in the case where a narrator in the Sanad (transmission chain) is not a widely known figure. In doing so, he was aided by his vast historical knowledge.

By the end of the classical era, the other three remaining schools had codified their laws into comprehensive jurisprudential systems; enforcing them far and wide. However, the Hanbalis stood apart from the other three madh'habs; by insisting on referring directly back to the Qur’an and Sunnah, to arrive at legal rulings. They also opposed the codification of Sharia (Islamic law) into a comprehensive system of jurisprudence; considering the Qur'an and Hadith to be the paramount sources.

Relationship with Sufism
Sufism, often described as the inner mystical dimension of Islam, is not a separate "school" or "sect" of the religion, but, rather, is considered by its adherents to be an "inward" way of approaching Islam which complements the regular outward practice of the five pillars; Sufism became immensely popular during the medieval period in practically all parts of the Sunni world and continues to remain so in many parts of the world today. As Christopher Melchert has pointed out, both Hanbalism and classical Sufism took concrete shapes in the ninth and early tenth-centuries CE, with both soon becoming "essential components of the high-medieval Sunni synthesis." Although many Hanbali scholars today, identifying themselves with various Salafi movements and the contemporary manifestation of the Wahhabi movement within Hanbalism, shun Sufism and its practices such as the Ziyarat (visitations of the graves of Awliyaa), which they deem heretical innovations in religion; the Hanbali school of Sunni law had a very intimate relationship with Sufism throughout Islamic history.

There is evidence that many medieval Hanbali scholars were very close to the Sufi martyr and saint Hallaj, whose mystical piety seems to have influenced many regular jurists in the school. Many later Hanbalis, meanwhile, were often Sufis themselves, including figures not normally associated with Sufism, such as Ibn Taymiyyah and Ibn Qayyim al-Jawziyyah. Both these men,  sometimes considered to be completely anti-Sufi in their leanings, were actually initiated into the Qadiriyya order of the celebrated mystic and saint Abdul Qadir Gilani, who was himself a renowned Hanbali Faqih. As the Qadiriyya Tariqah is often considered to be the largest and most widespread Sufi order in the world, with many branches spanning from Turkey to Pakistan, one of the largest Sufi branches is effectively founded on Hanbali school. Other prominent Hanbalite scholars who praised Sufism include Ibn 'Aqil, Ibn Qudamah, Ibn Rajab al-Hanbali, Muhammad Ibn ‘Abd al-Wahhab, etc.

Although Muhammad Ibn 'Abd al-Wahhab is sometimes regarded as a denier of Sufism, both he and his early disciples acclaimed Tasawwuf; believing it to be an important discipline in Islamic religion. Ibn 'Abd al-Wahhab prescribed various Sufi spiritual exercises to his followers for attaining Zuhd (asceticism), in accordance with Qur'an and Hadith. Extolling the virtuous Sufi Awliya (saints) who attained Ma'rifa (highest stage of mystical awareness in Sufism) as exemplars to his followers, Ibn 'Abd al-Wahhab stated: " “From among the wonders is to find a Sufi who is a faqih and a scholar who is an ascetic (zahid).” For indeed those who are concerned with the piety of the heart are often associated with a lack of ma‘rifah, which would necessitate abstinence from wrong and make jihad necessary. And those who are in-depth in knowledge at times mention such wickedness and doubts that place them in err and deviation... So, His love itself is the basis of His worship, and assigning equals (shirk) in love is the basis of polytheism in His worship... This is why the ‘arif Sufi shaykhs would advise many to pursue knowledge. Some of them would say: “A person only leaves a single Sunnah due to the pride in him.” "

List of Hanbali scholars
 Abu Dawood (d. 275 A.H.) Famous compiler of Sunan Abu Dawood.
 Abu Bakr al-Khallal – Jurist responsible for the school's early codification.
 Al-Hasan ibn 'Ali al-Barbahari (d. 329 A.H.), an Iraqi traditionist and a jurist, author of the book Sharh al-Sunnah (disputed).
 Ibn Battah al-Ukbari (d. 387 A.H.), an Iraqi theologian and jurisconsult, author of the book Al-Ibaanah.
 Abū 'Abdullāh Muhammad Ibn Manda (d. 395 A.H.), hadīth master, biographer and historian from Isfahan.
 Al-Qadi Abu Ya'la (d. 458 A.H.)
 Ibn Aqil (d. 513 A.H.)
 Awn ad-Din ibn Hubayra (d. 560 A.H.)
 Abdul Qadir Gilani (d. 561 A.H.)
 Abu-al-Faraj Ibn Al-Jawzi (d. 597 A.H.) – A famous jurist, exegete, critic, preacher and a prolific author, with works on nearly all subjects.
 Hammad al-Harrani (d. 598A.H.) – A jurist, critic and preacher who lived in Alexandria under the reign of Salahudin.
 Abd al-Ghani al-Maqdisi (d. 600 A.H.) – A prominent hadith master from Damascus and the nephew of Ibn Qudamah.
 Ibn Qudamah (d. 620A.H.) – One of the major Hanbali authorities and the author of the profound and voluminous book on Law, al-Mughni, which became popular amongst researchers from all juristic backgrounds. One of two individuals referred to as Shaykh al-Islām within the Hanbali school.
 Diya al-Din al-Maqdisi (d. 643 A.H.)
 Ibn Hamdan, Ahmad al-Harrani (d. 695 A.H.) - A jurist and judge born and raised in Harran and later practiced in Cairo
 Taqi al-Din Ibn Taymiyah (d. 728 A.H.) – A well-known figure in the Islamic history, known by his friends and foes for his expertise and controversial views in Islamic sciences. 
Ibn Muflih al Maqdisi (d. 763 A.H.)
 Ibn al-Qayyim (d. 751 A.H.) – The closest companion and a student of Ibn Taymiyah, also a respected jurist in his own right.
 Ibn Rajab (d. 795 A.H.) – A prominent jurist, traditionist, ascetic and preacher, who authored several important works, largely commenting upon famous collections of traditions.
al-Bahūtī (d. 1051 A.H.)
 Muhammad ibn Abd-al-Wahhab – A controversial Hanbali jurist and traditionalist, patronym of the Wahhabi movement.
 Ibn Humaid (d. 1295 A.H.) – A Hanbali jurist, traditionist, historian.
 Abd al-Aziz ibn Baz (d. 1419 A.H.) – Former Grand Mufti of Saudi Arabia.
 Ibn al-Uthaymeen (d. 1421 A.H.) – A leading jurist, grammarian, linguist, and a popular preacher.
 Abdullah Ibn Jibreen – A leading scholar of Saudi Arabia and was a former member of the Permanent Committee for Islamic Research and Fataawa in Saudi Arabia.
 Saleh Al-Fawzan – A well known scholar in Saudi Arabia and prolific author. He is currently a member of the Permanent Committee.
 Abdul Rahman Al-Sudais – The leading imam and khateeb of the Grand mosque chief of presidency of Haramain Committee, Saudi Arabia.
 Saud Al-Shuraim – The Imam and khateeb of the Grand Mosque Mecca and a professor of Islamic law at Umm al-Qura University.

See also 

 Outline of Islam
 Adhan
 Islamic schools and branches
 Islamic views on sin
 Salat
 Wudu

References

Further reading
 Abd al-Halim al-Jundi, Ahmad bin Hanbal Imam Ahl al-Sunnah, published in Cairo by Dar al-Ma'arif
 Dr. 'Ali Sami al-Nashshar, Nash'ah al-fikr al-falsafi fi al-islam, vol. 1, published by Dar al-Ma'arif, seventh edition, 1977
 Makdisi, George. "Hanābilah". Encyclopedia of Religion. Ed. Lindsay Jones. Vol. 6. 2nd ed. Detroit: Macmillan Reference USA, 2005. 3759–3769. 15 vols. Gale Virtual Reference Library. Thomson Gale. (Accessed December 14, 2005)
 Dar Irfan Jameel. "Introduction to Hanbali School of Jurisprudence".
 Vishanoff, David. "Nazzām, Al-." Ibid.
 Iqbal, Muzzafar. Chapter 1, "The Beginning", Islam and Science, Ashgate Press, 2002.
 Leaman, Oliver, "Islamic Philosophy". Routledge Encyclopedia of Philosophy, v. 5, pp. 13–16.

External links
 Hanbaliyyah at Overview of World Religions

 
Madhhab
Schools of Sunni jurisprudence
Sunni Islamic branches
Sunni Islam